Sayatbek Okassov (born 7 July, 1991) is a Kazakhstani freestyle wrestler. He won the silver medal in the men's 65 kg event at the 2019 Asian Wrestling Championships held in Xi'an, China.

Career 

In 2014, he competed in the 65 kg event at the World Wrestling Championships in Tashkent, Uzbekistan where he lost his only match against Franklin Gómez of Puerto Rico. In the following year, 2015, he was also eliminated from the competition after one match, this time against Toghrul Asgarov of Azerbaijan. 

In 2016, he competed at the first qualification tournament hoping to qualify for the 2016 Summer Olympics in Rio de Janeiro, Brazil. This was unsuccessful as he was eliminated from the tournament in his second match.

In 2018, he represented Kazakhstan at the Asian Games held in Indonesia and won one of the bronze medals in the men's 65 kg event.

Achievements

References

External links 
 

Living people
1991 births
Place of birth missing (living people)
Kazakhstani male sport wrestlers
Asian Games medalists in wrestling
Wrestlers at the 2018 Asian Games
Medalists at the 2018 Asian Games
Asian Games bronze medalists for Kazakhstan
Asian Wrestling Championships medalists
21st-century Kazakhstani people